Aaron Benjamin Feinberg (June 27, 1981) is an American inline skater, born in Gainesville, Florida. Feinberg resides in Portland, Oregon and has been skating since he was 12 years old.

Skating career
Feinberg initially had success as a park skater, skating skateparks and halfpipes, but progressed into a high-energy street skater. Feinberg is defined by his fluid style, high-power skating and constant innovation.

Feinberg rose to the very top of the skating world after being sponsored by Salomon Group. Salomon were so impressed with the talent of the young skater that they released the Salomon Aaron Feinberg Pro Model Inline Skate Model 2001. This skate became one of the most popular selling skates, and catapulted Salomon to a brief domination of the rollerblade market.

After participating in the X Games, Feinberg secured several competition medals during three years of participation: 
1997 - 1st Place Park (Gold)
1998 - 3rd Place Park (Bronze)
1999 - 3rd Place Park (Bronze)

In the Mindgame video Words, Feinberg skates for the first time in a video for Universal Skate Design Team.

Feinberg has been a part of a group of rollers who, over the last two decades, have been responsible for the progression of roller-blading as a spectacle, as well as a sport. During this time, roller-blading has been in the shadow of skateboarding in terms of popularity.

In October 2000 he was ranked fifth in the ASA World Championships.

Feinberg has received a total of four professional skates throughout his career, the first from Salomon (the same model was also the first skate to feature the Universal Frame System) and the rest being released by USD, including the USD Aaron Feinberg aggro skates.

Feinberg no longer skates for the USD Team, but is widely regarded to be one of the best skaters from 1997 until around 2007.

Aaron placed first in the Veterans division at the 2019 Blading Cup.

Film career
Feinberg has appeared in videos such as "Hoax 4", "Brain Fear Gone" (which is an anagram for the name Aaron Feinberg), "Videogroove 9" (VG9), Senate's 1999 team video "Standfast", "Suitable Material", Salomon videos "Focused" (1999) Saltless Water (2000) and "Burning Bridges" (2001), "USD Legacy" (2005), and Mindgame videos "Words" (2002), "Bang!" (2004), and "Accidental Machines" (2006).

Personal life
Feinberg and his girlfriend Cristina are known to frequent a local lounge in Portland called "The Crown Room" located in the Old Town District.

Citations and notes

References
 Rinehart, Robert E., Sydnor, Synthia, To the Extreme: Alternative Sports, Inside and Out, State University of New York Press, 2003
 Kaminker, Laura, In-Line Skating! Get Aggressive, The Rosen Publishing Group, 1999
 Noworyta, Paul, Transplant to Handplant: In Pursuit of a Dream ..., iUniverse, 2006
 Koff, Stephen, & Ertel, Karen, The Shopper's Guide to Washington, D.C.: Where to Find the Best of Everything, Capital Books, 2004
 Words (Mindgame), Produced by Trendkiller/Mindgame, Dustin Latimer and Shane Coburn editors, starring: Aaron Feinberg, Chris Farmer, Dustin Latimer, DVD media, 2003 Rollingvideos.com

1981 births
Living people
Aggressive inline skaters
Sportspeople from Gainesville, Florida
Jewish American sportspeople
21st-century American Jews